Adventures In Tokyo is the second full-length album by Christian rock band Calibretto 13 released on March 12, 2002.

Track listing 
 "Why Can't I Be On MTV?"
 "Dear Beelzebubba"
 "Cruisin' the Strip"
 "Sheep of The U.S."
 "From Me To You"
 "Hollywood (Is Burning Down)"
 "I'll Show the World"
 "The Night They Took You"
 "Father"
 "The Proposal"
 "I'll Talk to You Tomorrow"
 "America" *

*A bonus track that appears after "America" contains a rather lengthy sequence of audio clips compiled from messages left by the band members on each other's answering machines and voice mails.

References 

Calibretto 13 albums
2002 albums
Tooth & Nail Records albums
Albums produced by Aaron Sprinkle